Totness consists mainly of industrial zoned areas. It is commonly referred to as Mount Barker or Littlehampton but is actually a locality of Mt Barker that was cut off from the rest of the town by the construction of the South Eastern Freeway in 1977. There is no street sign indicating you are entering Totness. Its windmill is the oldest surviving building in the - Mt Barker area.

It is also home to the Totness Recreation Park.

Totness was first subdivided in the 1880s, without regard to its contours.
Part of the movie 'Ned Kelly', starring Mick Jagger, was filmed on Totness Rd.

References

Towns in South Australia